Haygrove School is a co-educational secondary school in Bridgwater, Somerset, England, with 1,106 students aged between 11 and 16.

In early July 2011, the school became an academy. In 2017/18, the school became a Multi-Academy Trust.

Location 
Haygrove School is located on Durleigh Road in Bridgwater.

The site was originally the Poplar School of Engineering And Navigation, then Dr Morgan's Grammar School For Boys, and finally Bridgwater Grammar School For Boys, before becoming Haygrove School in the 1970s with the Somerset County Council introduction of Comprehensive education.

Building Schools for the Future (BSF) 
Bridgwater was the first town in the South West level to be selected for the UK governments Building Schools for the Future initiative, which aimed to rebuild and renew nearly every secondary school in England. Within Bridgwater Building Schools for the Future was to develop all of the 4 secondary schools which are Chilton Trinity Technology College, Robert Blake Science College, East Bridgwater Community School and Haygrove School along with 2 special provision schools, Elmwood School and Penrose School, at an expected cost of around £100 Million. However, in July 2010, several components of the scheme for Bridgwater schools were cancelled, including the plans for Haygrove School.

Exam performance 
Percentage of students achieving 5+A*-C including English and Mathematics at GCSE level
 2013 - 76%
 2014 - 71%
 2015 - 77%
 2016 - 69%
Percentage of students achieving 5+A*-C in any subject at GCSE level
 1999 - 62%
 2000 - 68%
 2001 - 63%
 2002 - 66%
 2003 - 67%
 2004 - 64%
 2005 - 60%
 2006 - 64%
 2007 - 65%
 2008 - 63%
 2009 - 70%
 2010 - 74%
 2011 - 77%
 2012 - 84%
 2013 - 88%
 2014 - 78%
 2015 - 84%
 2016 - 78%

Notable pupils
Chris Skidmore (born 1991), cricketer

References

External links 
 

Academies in Somerset
Bridgwater
Secondary schools in Somerset